The 2015 Missouri State Bears football team represented Missouri State University in the 2015 NCAA Division I FCS football season. They were led by first-year head coach Dave Steckel and played their home games at the Plaster Sports Complex. They were a member of the Missouri Valley Football Conference. They finished the season 1–10, 0–8 in MVFC play to finish in last place.

Schedule

References

Missouri State
Missouri State Bears football seasons
Missouri State Bears football